Gymnostomum is a genus of bryophyte in family Pottiaceae. It was first described by Christian Gottfried Daniel Nees von Esenbeck and  Christian Friedrich Hornschuch

Species
The following species are recognised in the genus Gymnostomum:
 
Gymnostomum aeruginosum 
Gymnostomum angustatum 
Gymnostomum anoectangioides 
Gymnostomum antarcticum 
Gymnostomum apophysatum 
Gymnostomum aquaticum 
Gymnostomum aurantiacum 
Gymnostomum bescherellei 
Gymnostomum bewsii 
Gymnostomum boreale 
Gymnostomum brevicaule 
Gymnostomum brotherusii 
Gymnostomum calcareum  – calcareous gymnostomum moss
Gymnostomum capense 
Gymnostomum carthusianum 
Gymnostomum chenii 
Gymnostomum ciliatum 
Gymnostomum cirrhatum 
Gymnostomum complanatum 
Gymnostomum cucullatum 
Gymnostomum curvisetum 
Gymnostomum cylindricum 
Gymnostomum denticulatum 
Gymnostomum dimorphum 
Gymnostomum eurystomum 
Gymnostomum foliosum 
Gymnostomum gracile 
Gymnostomum guadalupense 
Gymnostomum hymenostomoides 
Gymnostomum hymenostylioides 
Gymnostomum inclinans 
Gymnostomum inconspicuum 
Gymnostomum jacksharpii 
Gymnostomum keniae 
Gymnostomum knightii 
Gymnostomum laeve 
Gymnostomum lamprocarpum 
Gymnostomum lanceolatum 
Gymnostomum latifolium 
Gymnostomum laxirete 
Gymnostomum laxirete 
Gymnostomum lessonii 
Gymnostomum linearifolium 
Gymnostomum lingulatum 
Gymnostomum longirostre 
Gymnostomum ludovicae 
Gymnostomum madagascariense 
Gymnostomum menziesii 
Gymnostomum mosis 
Gymnostomum obtusifolium 
Gymnostomum orizabanum 
Gymnostomum pabstianum 
Gymnostomum paucifolium 
Gymnostomum pottsii 
Gymnostomum prorepens 
Gymnostomum quadratum 
Gymnostomum reflexum 
Gymnostomum repandum 
Gymnostomum scaturiginosum 
Gymnostomum secundum 
Gymnostomum senocarpum 
Gymnostomum serratum 
Gymnostomum setifolium 
Gymnostomum simplicissimum 
Gymnostomum spathulatum 
Gymnostomum spirale 
Gymnostomum splachnobryoides 
Gymnostomum stillicidiorum 
Gymnostomum systylium 
Gymnostomum tenerrimum 
Gymnostomum truncatulum 
Gymnostomum umbrosum 
Gymnostomum unguiculatum 
Gymnostomum uvidum 
Gymnostomum valerianum 
Gymnostomum venezuelense 
Gymnostomum viridissimum 
Gymnostomum viridulum 
Gymnostomum wageri

References

Pottiaceae
Taxonomy articles created by Polbot
Moss genera